Westlake Academy (WA) is an open-enrollment charter school in the United States state of Texas, operating under the International Baccalaureate (IB) curriculum.

Overview
Westlake has three main academic programs: The IB Primary Years Programme (PYP) program lasts from kindergarten to fifth grade, while the IB Middle Years Programme (MYP) program runs from sixth grade to tenth grade. The school has also been certified for the IB Diploma Programme (DP), which began at the start of the 2008-2009 school year with the addition of an eleventh grade and now a twelfth grade. The school's first graduating class was in the 2009-2010 school year.

History and academics
Westlake Academy opened its doors in September 2003 when the Town of Westlake officials took advantage of the state of Texas' acceptance of charter schools and thus became the first and only municipality in the state to receive a charter designation. In 2008 the Texas Education Agency (TEA) renewed the charter until 2016. Westlake Academy became an International Baccalaureate World School in 2006, after it was authorized for the Primary Years Program (PYP). Further accreditation followed in 2007 with the Middle Years Program (MYP) and 2008 for the Diploma Program (DP), making it one of only five schools in the United States to offer all three programs, and the only one in Texas. For 2008, the Academy received an ‘Exemplary' rating from TEA for the Texas Assessment of Knowledge and Skills (TAKS) tests, the second time it has achieved this. 

On May 23, 2010, Westlake Academy's first senior class of 24 students graduated.

The Academy receives operating funds from the state. The Academy relies heavily on the support of parents and other members of the community. In June 2008 the architectural footprint expanded with the groundbreaking for a new Arts and Science Building, which was operational for the start of the 2009-10 school year. Two new buildings were created and started for the 2014-2015 year.

Extracurricular program

Arts
The school newspaper, “The Black Cow”, won forty-seven awards at the 2008 Texas UIL State Journalism Competition, the most by any school in Texas. 
The Black Calf is a version of the original Black Cow, only for the PYP program.

Westlake Academy offers a variety of musical activities, including the Chamber of Strings and Ensemble, which are for strings instruments. There is also Drum Line, for percussionists, which plays at games such as 6-man Football.

Athletics
Westlake Academy competes in the following High School programs
Football
Men's Soccer
Women's Soccer 
Women's Basketball
Men's Basketball
Baseball
Track and Field
Cross Country
Golf
Volleyball
Tennis
 
Women's Basketball TCAF State Champions: 2010, 2012, 2014, 2016, 2017, 2018, 2019.

Women's Cross Country TCAF State Champions:2010, 2011

In 2010-2011 the Women's Basketball team and the Cross Country team were state champions.  Westlake Academy competes as a member of the TCAF League.

In 2011-2012 the Women's Cross Country team won state again; and the Soccer team also won state.

The school's first varsity 6-man team was in the 2011-2012 year.

In 2015-2016 Westlake created their first all-girls soccer team to compete in leagues.

Baseball - TCAF State Champions: 2014 & 2015

The varsity volleyball team was very successful in the state championships 2014-2018 winning state all those years.

References

External links
 

Public elementary schools in Texas
Public middle schools in Texas
Schools in Tarrant County, Texas
Public high schools in Texas
Charter schools in Texas